A mathemagician is a mathematician who is also a magician.  The term "mathemagic" is believed to have been introduced by Royal Vale Heath with his 1933 book "Mathemagic".

The name "mathemagician" was probably first applied to Martin Gardner, but has since been used to describe many mathematician/magicians, including Arthur T. Benjamin, Persi Diaconis, and Colm Mulcahy.  Diaconis has suggested that the reason so many mathematicians are magicians is that "inventing a magic trick and inventing a theorem are very similar activities."

Mathemagician is a neologism, specifically a portmanteau, that combines mathematician and magician. A great number of self-working mentalism tricks rely on mathematical principles. Max Maven often utilizes this type of magic in his performance.

The Mathemagician is the name of a character in the 1961 children's book The Phantom Tollbooth.  He is the ruler of Digitopolis, the kingdom of mathematics.

Notable mathemagicians 

 Arthur T. Benjamin
 Jin Akiyama
 Persi Diaconis
 Richard Feynman
 Karl Fulves
 Martin Gardner
 Ronald Graham
 Royal Vale Heath
 Colm Mulcahy
 Raymond Smullyan
 W. W. Rouse Ball
 Alex Elmsley

References

Further reading 
 Diaconis, Persi & Graham, Ron. Magical Mathematics: The Mathematical Ideas That Animate Great Magic Tricks Princeton University Press, 2012.  
 Fulves, Karl. Self-working Number Magic, New York London : Dover Constable, 1983. 
 Gardner, Martin. Mathematics, Magic and Mystery, Dover, 1956. 
 Graham, Ron. Juggling Mathematics and Magic University of California, San Diego

Magicians
Mathematical science occupations
Portmanteaus